Blackamoors may refer to:

 Blackamoor (decorative arts), stylized depictions of black Africans in the decorative arts and jewelry
 Blackmoor (campaign setting), a fantasy roleplaying game campaign setting
 Blackmoor (supplement), a 1975 supplementary rulebook for Dungeons & Dragons
 Blackamoor, Lancashire, a village in England
Blacka Moor, a moor in South Yorkshire, England
 Black tetra, a small fish also called a blackamoor (Gymnocorymbus ternetzi)
 Black Moor goldfish
 The Moor of Peter the Great, sometimes translated The Blackamoor of Peter the Great
 Blackamoores, a 2013 book
 Maure, stylized depictions of black Africans in heraldry, sometimes called Blackamoors
 Moors, Muslims of Spain and North Africa

See also
Black Moor (disambiguation)
Blackmore (disambiguation)
Blakemore (disambiguation)
Moor (disambiguation)